North Somerset Council is the local authority for the unitary authority of North Somerset, England. Until 1 April 1996 it was a non-metropolitan district called Woodspring, in the county of Avon.

Political control
Since the first election to the council in 1973 political control of the council has been held by the following parties:

Woodspring Non-metropolitan district

North Somerset Unitary authority

Leadership
The leaders of the council since 2005 have been:

Council elections

Non-metropolitan district elections
1973 Woodspring District Council election
1976 Woodspring District Council election
1979 Woodspring District Council election (New ward boundaries)
1980 Woodspring District Council election
1982 Woodspring District Council election
1983 Woodspring District Council election (District boundary changes took place but the number of seats remained the same)
1984 Woodspring District Council election (District boundary changes took place but the number of seats remained the same)
1986 Woodspring District Council election
1987 Woodspring District Council election
1991 Woodspring District Council election (District boundary changes took place but the number of seats remained the same)

Unitary authority elections
1995 North Somerset Council election
1999 North Somerset Council election (New ward boundaries increased the number of seats by 2)
2003 North Somerset Council election
2007 North Somerset Council election
2011 North Somerset Council election (New ward boundaries)
2015 North Somerset Council election (New ward boundaries)
2019 North Somerset Council election

District result maps

By-election results

1995–1999

1999–2003

2003–2007

2007–2011

2011–2015

2015–2019

References

External links
North Somerset Council
By-election results

 
Council elections in Somerset
Politics of North Somerset
North Somerset
Council elections in Avon